Dodson Valley is a sub-suburb in Nelson, New Zealand, located by heading north into Atawhai. It borders between the coast Nelson Haven and further inland, featuring the main St. Dodson Valley Road.

References

Populated places in the Nelson Region